Juan de Medina Rincón y de la Vega, O.S.A. (27 December 1520 – 30 June 1588) was a Roman Catholic prelate who served as Bishop of Michoacán (1574–1588).

Biography
Juan de Medina Rincón y de la Vega was born on 27 December 1520 in Medina del Campo, Spain and ordained a priest in the Order of Saint Augustine.
On 18 June 1574, he was appointed during the papacy of Pope Gregory XIII as Bishop of Michoacán.
On 5 December 1574, he was consecrated bishop by Pedro de Moya y Contreras, Archbishop of México, with Antonio Ruíz de Morales y Molina, Bishop of Tlaxcala, serving as co-consecrator. 
He served as Bishop of Michoacán until his death on 30 June 1588. 
While bishop, he was the principal co-consecrator of Alfonso Graniero Avalos,  Bishop of La Plata o Charcas (1579).

References

External links and additional sources
 (for Chronology of Bishops) 
 (for Chronology of Bishops) 

16th-century Roman Catholic bishops in Mexico
Bishops appointed by Pope Gregory XIII
1520 births
1588 deaths
People from the Province of Valladolid
Augustinian bishops